Wyses Corner is a farming community in the Musquodoboit Valley area of the Halifax Regional Municipality, Nova Scotia on Route 212.

Communications
The postal Code is B0N 1Y0 
The Telephone exchange is 902-384

Navigator

References
Explore HRM

Communities in Halifax, Nova Scotia
General Service Areas in Nova Scotia